Immigration to Peru involves the movement of immigrants to Peru from another country. Peru is a multiethnic nation formed by the combination of different groups over five centuries. Amerindians inhabited Peruvian territory for several millennia before Spanish Conquest in the 16th century. Spaniards and Africans arrived in large numbers under the Viceroyalty. Many people from European backgrounds mixed with the Amerindians or Asians creating an entirely new demographic group called "mestizos".

Various European ethnic groups settled in Peru following their 1824 independence from Spain, and the majority settled in the coasts and urban areas like Lima. After the abolition of slavery in 1854, immigrants from countries such as China, Northern Europe, and Japan arrived to do labor work in areas such as farming.  In 2005, the UN put the number of immigrants in Peru at 42,000, which accounted for less than 1% of its population. However, a more recent report from the Peruvian Directorate of Migrations has put the number at 64,303.  The largest group of foreign residents is from Argentina, which accounts for about 14% of the total with over 9000 Argentineans living in Peru. Immigrants from the United States make up just over 9% of the total with 5,800 US citizens now residing in Peru.  Other large groups of immigrants in Peru include Chileans, Bolivians, Colombians, Brazilians, Uruguayans, Spanish and Chinese.  The majority of foreign residents in Peru live in Lima, with other communities found in Cusco and Arequipa.

Pre-Colonial and Post-Colonial Patterns 
Before colonialism, Andean communities were connected through the coast, jungles, and highlands, as well as Andean centers. As a civilization, they managed to produce, distribute, and exchange goods throughout Peru and the Andes region. When Spanish conquistadors conquered the Andes region, new forms of regulations developed over the land. Trade, Indigenous people, and government institutions were controlled to fit the colonialist mold, with changes in class and power structure. During the colonial period, African and European movement to Peru increased the population's diversity, with the post-colonial immigration patterns increasing due to the expansion of capitalism, industrialization, and urbanization. Lima's population was 4.6 million residents in 1981, in comparison to 645,000 residents in 1940.

Peru's political crisis and rising unemployment rate in the late 1980s and early 1990s caused Peruvians to immigrate to other countries, such as the United States, Japan, Spain, and Italy. The latter three countries had a demand for foreign workers to fill jobs in manufacturing and domestic work. The former implemented policies that made it difficult for immigrants to arrive and stay, including border patrol measures. This happened following the 1986 Immigration Reform and Control Act granted around 3 million undocumented immigrants legal status. In the mid-1990s, immigration to Argentina and Chile increased due to the proximity of those countries and the ability to enter on a tourist visa. In two or three days, a bus can arrive to Argentina or Chile from Peru.

Current Patterns and Foreigner Demographics 
As of 2012, 3.5 million Peruvians have emigrated to other countries, with The United States, Spain, Argentina, Italy, Chile, Japan, and Venezuela containing 90% of them. The foreign population of Peru was 103,654 in 2016, with the top 5 countries represented being Colombia, Spain, the United States, Argentina, and Ecuador. Nearly half of the immigrant population (46.1%) at the time consisted of experts, such as scientists, engineers, teachers, and missionaries. Most immigrants to Peru have a work (44.5%), family (28.7%), or immigrant visa (9.1%). As of 2019, around 800,000 Venezuelan migrants and refugees were located in Peru, and more than 390,000 Venezuelans have been granted temporary residence permits there.

Immigration and Visa Process 
Citizens from nearly 100 countries and territories, such as the United States, Canada, Mexico, Jamaica, South Africa, Taiwan, Hong Kong, Brunei, and all countries in South America, the European Union, and Oceania are eligible to enter Peru without a visa and stay for up to 183 days. Other countries, such as Turkey, Georgia, Azerbaijan, United Arab Emirates, China, and every African country except South Africa, are required to apply for a visa before their arrival in Peru at a Peruvian consulate in their country or a nearby country. For a tourist visa, required documents are not limited to a valid passport, proof of citizenship, an application fee, and travel itinerary. Staying on an expired visa will result in paying US$1 for each day overstayed, which is able to be paid at a "Banco de la Nación" branch. If a person is unable to pay the fine, they will have to stay in custody until someone pays it off on their behalf.
For a business visa, every foreigner is required to apply for one in advance at a Peruvian Consulate in their country. Obtaining a student, work, or other type of visa has different requirements, depending on the situation. For a business visa, every foreigner is required to apply for one in advance at a Peruvian Consulate in their country. Obtaining a student or work visa has different requirements, depending on the situation.

To obtain permanent residency, a foreigner is required to live in Peru for at least three years. For naturalization, a foreigner must legally reside in Peru for at least two years, given that they own assets in Peru and they were not outside of the country for more than 183 days in one year. If a foreigner is married to a Peruvian citizen, the couple is required to be married for at least two years before the foreigner is able to apply for naturalization. Peru permits dual citizenship, but this does not grant birthright rights to the naturalized person.

Anyone who lives in Peru for more than 183 days in one year is required to pay for taxes, as they are considered a tax resident. The type of tax paid depends on if the person is a tax resident or a non-resident. Tax residents pay their income tax based on their global income and non-residents pay 30% of their Peruvian income on taxes. Starting residency in Peru after June 30 means that one will not become a tax resident until the following calendar year, shall that person still remain in the country after 183 days.

References 

 
Society of Peru